McCovey is a surname. Notable people with the surname include:

Willie McCovey (1938–2018), American baseball player

See also
McCooey
McCovey Cove, the name for a section of San Francisco Bay
Wendi McLendon-Covey (born 1969), American actress, writer, producer, and comedian